IBD Deisenroth Engineering was a German company specializing in the design of armor for military vehicles. They formed in 1981 to develop applications of a new explosive suitable for use in explosive reactive armor (ERA). Through the 1980s, they developed many individual applications for the Bundeswehr. In 1994, they introduced their MEXAS armor systems using ceramic armor which were very popular as upgrade systems for a wide range of armored vehicles, mostly in NATO. MEXAS was replaced by AMAP in 2006, which includes a wide variety of modular armor, both active and passive.

The company started a production arm in 1991, Chempro. Chempro was purchased by Rheinmetall in 2007 and merged it with their existing ammunition division to form Rheinmetall Chempro. The two companies formed ADS Protection the same year to produce an active armor system ("hard kill"). On 1 June 2019, Rheinmetall purchased most remaining assets of IBD Deisenroth and formed Rheinmetall Protection Systems GmbH.

References

German companies established in 1981